Padargad is a small fort used for vigilance in the past. is situated to the east of Karjat in the Indian state of Maharashtra. It is on the Bhimashanker trek route in the Karjat area, because of its height and difficult climbing, it is not visited by most of the trekkers.

History

Little history is known about the fort. The locals say that it is not a fort but a sort of lighthouse from where the directions were given to know the advancements of the enemy through the Ganapati Ghat road. It can be called a watch tower to keep a vigil on the Mawal area in the greater province of the Maratha. Records say that this fort along with Tungi fort was constructed by Aurangjeb while capturing the Kothaligad Fort.

How to reach
The base village is Khandas which is 31 km from Karjat. Karjat is well connected by road and railway from Mumbai and Pune

Trekking path
The starting point for the trek is Khandas village. The path to the Ganpati ghat leads to the small hamlet Padarwadi. From Padarwadi a narrow path to the south leads to the pinnacle of Padargad. The climb is somewhat difficult and only professional trekkers with proper equipment attempt the climb. The narrow climbing path to the top of the fort is locally called chimney.

Places to visit
There is a large cave and few dried up water cut cisterns on the fort. The narrow pinnacle is called Kalavantins pinnacle.

See also
List of forts in Maharashtra
 Marathi People
 List of Maratha dynasties and states
 Maratha War of Independence
 Battles involving the Maratha Empire
 Maratha Army
 Maratha titles
 Military history of India
 List of people involved in the Maratha Empire

References 

Buildings and structures of the Maratha Empire
Forts in Raigad district
16th-century forts in India
Caves of Maharashtra
Tourist attractions in Raigad district